

Jeffrey Snover is a Distinguished Engineer at Google. Previously a Microsoft Technical Fellow, PowerShell Chief Architect, and the Chief Architect for Windows Server and the Azure Infrastructure and Management group which includes Azure Stack, System Center and Operations Management Suite. Snover is the inventor of Windows PowerShell, an object-based distributed automation engine, scripting language, and command line shell and was the chief architect for Windows Server.

Biography 
After studying physics at the University of New Hampshire (1978–1982), Snover worked as architect and development manager for Tivoli NetView at Tivoli Software (IBM), and as a consulting software engineer in the DEC management group at Apollo Computer, where he led various network and systems management projects. He also worked at Storage Technology Corporation, and various start-up companies. Snover joined Microsoft in 1999 as divisional architect for the Management and Services Division, providing technical direction for Microsoft's management technologies and products.

Snover is known primarily as the "father" and chief architect of Microsoft's object-oriented command line interpreter Windows PowerShell, whose development began under the codename "Monad" (msh) at the beginning of 2003. He had the idea of an object-pipeline and implemented the first prototype  in the C# programming language. After the completion of version 1.0 in November 2006, Windows PowerShell was downloaded nearly one million times within half a year. In 2015, Microsoft promoted Snover to Technical Fellow.

Snover was also the Chief Architect of the Microsoft Management Console (MMC). 

Snover  held eight patents prior to joining Microsoft, and has registered over 30 patents since. He is a frequent speaker at industry and research conferences on a variety of management and language topics.

References

Bibliography 
 Snover, Jeffrey: Monad Manifesto – the Origin of Windows PowerShell, 2007

Further reading

External links 
Profile at Microsoft

Blog
Monad Manifesto, Jeffrey P. Snover, version 1.2, 2002
On Channel 9
On Stack Overflow
On Stack Exchange
On GitHub
On Powershell Gallery
Windows Server, the Story of 3 DEC Engineers

Microsoft employees
Microsoft Windows people
American computer programmers
Microsoft technical fellows
American computer scientists
Living people
Year of birth missing (living people)
Industry and corporate fellows